Electoral districts in Iran are used for elections to the Islamic Consultative Assembly.

Overview 
The parliament currently has 207 constituencies, including a total of 5 reserved seats for the religious minorities recognized by the constitution. The rest of 202 constituencies are territorial and coincide with 1 or more of Iran's 368 Shahrestans.

List

Ardibil 
 Ardabil, Nir, Namin and Sareyn
 Germi
 Khalkhal and Kowsar
 Meshginshahr
 Parsabad and Bilesavar

East Azerbaijan 
 Ahar and Heris
 Bonab
 Bostanabad
 Hashtrud and Charuymaq
 Kaleybar, Khoda Afarin and Hurand
 Malekan
 Maragheh and Ajabshir
 Marand and Jolfa
 Mianeh
 Sarab
 Shabestar
 Tabriz, Osku and Azarshahr
 Varzaqan

Fars 
 Shiraz

Gilan 
 Astaneh-ye Ashrafiyeh
 Astara
 Bandar-e Anzali
 Fuman and Shaft
 Lahijan and Siahkal
 Langarud
 Rasht
 Roudsar and Amlash
 Rudbar
 Sowme'eh Sara
 Talesh, Rezvanshahr and Masal

Isfahan 
 Golpayegan and Khvansar
 Isfahan
 Natanz and Qamsar

Qom 
 Qom

Razavi Khorasan 
 Mashhad and Kalat

Tehran 
 Tehran, Rey, Shemiranat and Eslamshahr

West Azerbaijan 
 Bukan
 Khoy and Chaypareh
 Mahabad
 Maku, Chaldoran, Poldasht and Showt
 Miandoab, Shahin Dezh and Takab
 Naqadeh and Oshnavieh
 Piranshahr and Sardasht
 Salmas
 Urmia

Zanjan 
 Abhar and Khorramdarreh
 Khodabandeh
 Mahneshan and Ijrud
 Zanjan and Tarom

Religious minorities 
 Armenians
 Assyrian
 Jewish
 Zoroastrian

See also 
 Electoral district

References